William Renshaw defeated Harry S. Barlow 3–6, 5–7, 8–6, 10–8, 8–6 in the All Comers' Final, and then defeated his brother and reigning champion Ernest Renshaw 6–4, 6–1, 3–6, 6–0 in the challenge round to win the gentlemen's singles tennis title at the 1889 Wimbledon Championships. Renshaw survived a total of six match points in the All Comers Final against Barlow at 2–5 and 6–7 in the fourth set and trailed 0–5 in the final set.

Draw

Challenge round

All comers' finals

Top half

Bottom half

References

External links

Gentlemen's Singles
Wimbledon Championship by year – Men's singles